The Chief Mountain Border Crossing connects the town of Babb, Montana with Pincher Creek, Alberta on the Canada–US border. Montana Highway 17 on the American side joins Alberta Highway 6 on the Canadian side, creating the only road border crossing within the Waterton-Glacier International Peace Park. Poker Creek–Little Gold Creek and this crossing are the only ones closed in winter.

Canadian side
To provide employment during the Great Depression, relief work camps operated from late 1932 to 1935, by which time the highway was almost complete. Called the Kennedy Creek Cut Off or Kennedy Creek-Belly River Road during construction, the agreed name of The Chief Mountain International Highway was suggested by Herbert Legg of Canada Customs. No formal ceremony marked the opening in June 1936.

When Legg had earlier examined the proposed customs site on an uncompleted section of road, he discovered the surveyed route would create an unsatisfactory uphill grade to the boundary. In response, the engineer built the road farther down the hillside. At then the highest elevation in Canada for a customs office, snow covered the ground when it opened in a tent in May 1936. The unpaved highway became muddy during the spring thaw making travel difficult. A combined customs office/residence building was completed in 1937.

COVID-19 restrictions prevented the seasonal reopening of the crossing in 2020 and 2021.

US side
The highway was built over 13 months between the fall of 1934 and the summer of 1936 by Montana state employees and contractors.

The Chief Mountain Border Station and Quarters, constructed in 1939, was added to the National Register of Historic Places on May 20, 2008.

See also
 List of Canada–United States border crossings

References

Canada–United States border crossings
Glacier National Park (U.S.)
1936 establishments in Montana
1936 establishments in Alberta